The men's 110 metres hurdles event at the 1992 World Junior Championships in Athletics was held in Seoul, Korea, at Olympic Stadium on 17 and 18 September.  106.7 cm (3'6) (senior implement) hurdles were used.

Medalists

Results

Final
18 September
Wind: +1.6 m/s

Semifinals
17 September

Semifinal 1
Wind: +0.1 m/s

Semifinal 2

Heats
17 September

Heat 1
Wind: +1.1 m/s

Heat 2
Wind: +0.8 m/s

Heat 3
Wind: +0.5 m/s

Heat 4
Wind: +0.3 m/s

Participation
According to an unofficial count, 24 athletes from 20 countries participated in the event.

References

110 metres hurdles
Sprint hurdles at the World Athletics U20 Championships